Animals of China may refer to:
 Wildlife of China
 List of endangered and protected species of China
 Chinese zodiac, consisting of twelve animals
 Four benevolent animals: the Qilin, Chinese dragon, Turtle and Fenghuang
 Four Symbols (China), four mythological creatures in Chinese constellations

See also
 Animal welfare and rights in China
 Chinese Animal Protection Network